Matt Palmer is an Australian racing driver who previously competed in the Dunlop Super2 Series.

Career results

Career summary

References

Living people
Australian racing drivers
Year of birth missing (living people)